Sons of Wichita: How the Koch Brothers became America's most powerful and private dynasty (2014) is a non-fiction book written by the American journalist Daniel Schulman about the wealthy Koch family and their political activities.

See also
Political activities of the Koch brothers
Koch family
Citizen Koch
Charles Koch
David Koch

References

External links 
 Daniel Schulman, Sons of Wichita, 2014, preview at Google Books 

2014 non-fiction books
American biographies
American political books
Grand Central Publishing books
Books about the Kochs